{{DISPLAYTITLE:C5H7NO}}
The molecular formula C5H7NO (molar mass: 97.11 g/mol, exact mass: 97.0528 u) may refer to:

 Furfurylamine
 Oxazepine